Charles Lyndhurst Winslow (1 August 1888 – 15 September 1963) was a three-time Olympic tennis medalist from South Africa. He won two gold medals: Men's Singles and Doubles at the 1912 Summer Olympics in Stockholm. Eight years later, in Antwerp, Winslow won a bronze medal in the Men's Singles event.

Winslow's father Lyndhurst Winslow played first-class cricket for Sussex County Cricket Club, scoring a century on debut against Gloucestershire County Cricket Club, while Winslow's son Paul played Test cricket for South Africa.

Winslow had a home at 157 Beacon Street in Boston that was sold to the family of Henry Weston Farnsworth in 1910. He died on 15 September 1963 in Johannesburg, South Africa at the age of 75.

Sources
 Overson, C. "... and never got another one", The Cricket Statistician, No. 144, Association of Cricket Statisticians and Historians, Nottingham, UK.

References

External links
 
 

1888 births
1963 deaths
English emigrants to South Africa
South African male tennis players
Olympic tennis players of South Africa
Olympic gold medalists for South Africa
Olympic bronze medalists for South Africa
Tennis players at the 1912 Summer Olympics
Tennis players at the 1920 Summer Olympics
Olympic medalists in tennis
Medalists at the 1912 Summer Olympics
Medalists at the 1920 Summer Olympics